John Daniel Shepperson (February 2, 1851 – December 1, 1921) was an American politician who served in the Virginia House of Delegates. He later worked as a postmaster for ten years.

He and his wife Mary Agnes "Mamie" Burton (died 1911) had five daughters (Mary, Lucy, Gay, Edmonia, and another) and a son (Archie). Shepperson died on December 1, 1921, in Keysville. His funeral was held the next day.

References

External links 

1851 births
1921 deaths
Democratic Party members of the Virginia House of Delegates
19th-century American politicians